Speicherbecken Lohsa is a lake in Oberlausitz, Saxony, Germany. At an elevation of 110.6 m, its surface area is 10.81 km².

Lakes of Saxony